Arthur Davenport (21 April 1818 - 28 February 1907) was an Anglican priest in Australia during the nineteenth century.

Tancred was born in the City of London and  educated at Merchant Taylors' School and Christ's College, Cambridge. After a curacy in Ipswich he travelled to Tasmania. Davenport was Vicar of Hobart from 1846 to 1880; and Archdeacon of Hobart from 1880 to 1888.

His grandson, Arthur Davenport, was awarded the Military Cross during World War One.

References

1818 births
People from the City of London
1907 deaths
Anglican archdeacons in Tasmania
Alumni of Christ's College, Cambridge
19th-century Australian Anglican priests
20th-century Australian Anglican priests
People educated at Merchant Taylors' School, Northwood